Queenie Rosson (February 24, 1889 – December 19, 1978, West Palm Beach, Florida) was an early American silent film actress.

She starred in 20 silent films between 1914 and 1916 in films such as The Love Hermit working with actors such as Charlotte Burton and Harry von Meter.

Siblings 

The six children of Arthur Richard Rosson and Hellen Rochefort. Arthur Richard Rosson was also married to one Anna Hatz but no current data of siblings.

 Arthur Henry Rosson Arthur Rosson 1886 – 1960
 Ethel (Queenie) Rosson 1889 – 1978
 Gladys Rosson 1891 – 1953
 Richard Marquez Rosson Richard Rosson 1893 – 1953
 Harold G (Hal) Rosson Harold Rosson 1895 – 1988
 Helene M Rosson 1897 – 1985 Helene Rosson

Filmography
The Love Hermit (1916) .... Grace Hamilton
Matchin' Jim (1916)
The Gambler's Lost Love (1916)
That Gal of Burke's (1916)
The Quicksands of Deceit (1916)
The Demon of Fear (1916)
The Gulf Between (1916/II)
With a Life at Stake (1916) .... Bess, Telephone Operator
... aka The Broncho Buster's Bargain (USA: reissue title) 
Billy Van Deusen's Muddle (1916)
A Trunk an' Trouble (1916)
The Laird o'Knees (1916)
The Broken Cross (1916)
Water Stuff (1916) .... Jennie Lee
... aka Buck Parvin #6: Water Stuff (USA: series title) 
Let There Be Light (1915)
Where Ignorance Is Bliss (1915) 
Nothing Ever Happens Right (1915)
The Grind (1915) .... Jean's sister
... aka On the Verge of Sin 
Fares, Please! (1915)
The Barnstormers (1914)
The Patchwork Girl of Oz (1914) (unconfirmed) (uncredited)
... aka L. Frank Baum's Whimsical Fairy Tale The Patchwork Girl of Oz 
... aka Ragged Girl of Oz (USA: reissue title) 
... aka The Raggedy Girl (USA: reissue title) 
His Wife's Family (1914)

External links

 

American silent film actresses
1889 births
1978 deaths
20th-century American actresses
Burials at Arlington National Cemetery